Vascular permeability, often in the form of capillary permeability or microvascular permeability, characterizes the capacity of a blood vessel wall to allow for the flow of small molecules (drugs, nutrients, water, ions) or even whole cells (lymphocytes on their way to the site of inflammation) in and out of the vessel. Blood vessel walls are lined by a single layer of endothelial cells. The gaps between endothelial cells (cell junctions) are strictly regulated depending on the type and physiological state of the tissue.

There are several techniques to measure vascular permeability to certain molecules. For instance, the cannulation of a single microvessel with a micropipette, the microvessel is perfused with a certain pressure,  occluded downstream and then the velocity of some cells will be related to the permeability. Another technique uses multiphoton fluorescence intravital microscopy through which the flow is related to fluorescence intensity and the permeability is estimated from the Patlak transformation  of the intensity data 

In cancer research, the study of permeability of the microvasculature that surrounds tumours is of great interest as the vascular wall is a barrier of large molecules into the tumours, the vessels control the microenvironment which affect tumour progression and changes to the permeability may indicate vascular damage with drugs.

An example of increased vascular permeability is in the initial lesion of periodontal disease, in which the gingival plexus becomes engorged and dilated, allowing large numbers of neutrophils to extravasate and appear within the junctional epithelium and underlying connective tissue.

References

External links
 

Cardiovascular physiology